30 Days is an American reality television show on the FX cable network in the United States, created and hosted by Morgan Spurlock. In each episode, Spurlock, or some other person or group of people, spend 30 days immersing themselves in a particular lifestyle with which they are unfamiliar (e.g. working for minimum wage, being in prison, a Christian living as a Muslim etc.), while discussing related social issues. As in Spurlock's film, Super Size Me, there are a number of rules unique to each situation which must be followed during each such experiment. At least one episode each season has featured Spurlock as the person spending the month in the particular lifestyle.

Season one premiered on June 15, 2005, and its respective DVD set was released July 11, 2006. The second season premiered on July 26, 2006. Season 3 of 30 Days premiered on June 3, 2008. Later that same year, FX said that it would not be renewing the series for a fourth season, effectively canceling the show. The show has recently been picked up for re-air by Destination America, though no new episodes have been ordered.

In the United Kingdom, the program is broadcast on More4 and Channel 4. In Australia, the program is broadcast on Network Ten and Lifestyle Channel. It currently airs in Canada on Independent Film Channel and Canal Vie. It also airs on FX in Latin America. In Norway it airs on TV 2. In Sweden it airs on TV4 and Kanal 9.

Episode listing

Season 1: 2005

Season 2: 2006

Season 3: 2008

DVD releases

References

External links
 30 Days at Planet Green
 30 Days at Actual Reality Pictures
 

2005 American television series debuts
2008 American television series endings
2000s American reality television series
2000s American documentary television series
English-language television shows
FX Networks original programming
Television series by Reveille Productions
Television Academy Honors winners